Anaidinae is a subfamily of the scarabaeoid beetle family Hybosoridae. It presently includes 6 extant genera and 3 fossil genera.

Genera
Anaides Westwood, 1845
Callosides Howden, 1971
Chaetodus Westwood, 1845
Cryptogenius Westwood, 1845
Hybochaetodus Arrow, 1909
Totoia Ocampo, 2003

Extinct genera
†Crassisorus
†Cretanaides
†Protanaides

References

Scarabaeiformia
Beetle subfamilies